Kahang or Kohang in Iran may refer to:
 Kahang, Isfahan
 Kohang, Khuzestan
 Kahang, Sistan and Baluchestan
 Kahang, Tehran